The Russian Premier League 2008 was the 17th edition of the Russian Football Championship, and the seventh under the current Russian Premier League name. The season started on Friday, 14 March 2008 with a match between Terek and Krylia Sovetov in Grozny. Krylia Sovetov won 3–0. The first goal of the season was scored by Krylia Sovetov's forward Yevgeny Savin.

Due to Russia's participation in UEFA Euro 2008, the season was interrupted from 16 May until 5 July.

The champions were determined on the 27th matchday, 2 November 2008. Rubin claimed their first championship title in Russian Premier League, defeating Saturn 2–1 away, with Savo Milošević scoring in the 89th minute to claim the title for his club. Rubin became the third (and second consecutive) non-Moscow club to become Russian champions.

The last round of matches was played on 22 November 2008.

Teams 
As in the previous season, 16 teams played in the 2008 season. After the 2007 season, Kuban Krasnodar and Rostov were relegated to the 2008 Russian First Division. They were replaced by Shinnik Yaroslavl and Terek Grozny, the winners and runners up of the 2007 Russian First Division.

Venues

Personnel and kits

Managerial changes

League table

Results

Season statistics

Top goalscorers

Awards 
On 16 December 2008 Russian Football Union named its list of 33 top players:

Goalkeepers
  Igor Akinfeev (CSKA)
  Sergei Ryzhikov (Rubin)
  Vyacheslav Malafeev (Zenit)

Right backs
  Aleksandr Anyukov (Zenit)
  Cristian Ansaldi (Rubin)
  Vasili Berezutskiy (CSKA)

Right-centre backs
  Denis Kolodin (Dynamo)
  Rodolfo (Lokomotiv)
  Dmitri Belorukov (Amkar)

Left-centre backs
  Sergei Ignashevich (CSKA)
  Leandro Fernández (Dynamo)
  Aleksei Popov (Amkar/Rubin)

Left backs
  Radek Šírl (Zenit)
  Aleksei Berezutskiy (CSKA)
  Renat Yanbaev (Lokomotiv)

Defensive midfielders
  Anatoliy Tymoschuk (Zenit)
  Sergei Semak (Rubin)
  Dmitri Khokhlov (Dynamo)

Right wingers
  Miloš Krasić (CSKA)
  Igor Denisov (Zenit)
  Kirill Kombarov (Dynamo)

Central midfielders
  Danny (Dynamo/Zenit)
  Igor Semshov (Dynamo)
  Alan Dzagoev (CSKA)

Left wingers
  Yuri Zhirkov (CSKA)
  Konstantin Zyryanov (Zenit)
  Diniyar Bilyaletdinov (Lokomotiv)

Right forwards
  Vágner Love (CSKA)
  Pavel Pogrebnyak (Zenit)
  Roman Pavlyuchenko (Spartak M.)

Left forwards
  Andrei Arshavin (Zenit)
  Marko Topić (Saturn)
  Gökdeniz Karadeniz (Rubin)

Medal squads

References

External links 
 Official website 
 Russian Football Union 

2007
1
Russia
Russia